Raj Mandir Cinema is a movie theatre in Jaipur in Rajasthan state in India. Situated on the Bhagwan Das Road, near M.I. Road, the meringue-shaped auditorium opened in 1976, and over the years has seen many movie premieres of Hindi films, and has become a popular symbol of Jaipur.

History

It opened on 1 June 1976 with the film "Charas". It was designed by architect W.M. Namjoshi in Art Moderne style (Streamline Moderne or late Art Deco). Known for its large size as well as opulent and meringue interiors, Raj Mandir remains an important part of the tourist circuit, and thus usually remains full despite its size. The Bhuramal Rajmal Surana group, a prominent Jaipur jewelry house, owns and operates the cinema. The nine stars on the exterior signify nine gemstones in the Navaratna style, an homage to the owners' jewelry house.

Notes 

 Bhuramal Rajmal Surana Owner Of Rajmandir Cinema

References 

 

Cinemas in India
Tourist attractions in Jaipur
1976 establishments in Rajasthan
Streamline Moderne architecture
Art Deco architecture in India
Buildings and structures in Jaipur
Buildings and structures completed in 1976
20th-century architecture in India